ChicagoNow was a blogging site managed by Tribune Publishing, owner of the print Chicago Tribune newspaper. It featured a network of blogs of international, national, and local interest on a variety of topics ranging from crime to public schools to politics and diplomacy.

Notable ChicagoNow contributors included the staff of the Chicago Reporter, and Shimer College president Susan Henking.

On August 18th, 2022, the site was shut down with no announcement.

History 
ChicagoNow was launched in August 2009.  Its launch coincided with the Tribune company's bankruptcy.  As a newspaper-run blogging community, with the initial tagline "a blog by and for locals", it represented what one observer called "a new value proposition for newspapers".

ChicagoNow utilized Movable Type as its blogging platform when it first launched but switched to WordPress in 2011.

The website of the Tribune daily RedEye, which later moved to its own domain, was initially hosted on ChicagoNow.

After the acquisition of the Tribune by Alden Global Capital ChicagoNow was shut down without warning on August 18, 2022.

Reception 
In April 2010, the World Editors Forum described ChicagoNow as a "hyperlocal blog network" that has "a personal quality that many larger newspapers lack."

In September 2010, Time Out Chicago criticized ChicagoNow for hosting an unidentified police officer in what they called "a hate-filled, racist rant by blogger Joe the Cop, entitled The ghetto shooting template, for three days and counting now." ChicagoNow removed the posts in question, stating that while they don't edit posts, they reserve the right to remove them.

References

External links
 
 Tribune Media Group's ChicagoNow 2009 introduction

American blogs
Tribune Publishing
Internet properties established in 2009
Internet properties disestablished in 2022
2009 establishments in Illinois